Mazari may refer to:
Mazari (Emirati tribe) a Bedouin tribe of the United Arab Emirates.
Mazari (Baloch tribe), a prominent Baloch tribe settled in Rajanpur and Sindh, Pakistan
List of Pakistani political families#Mazari
Abdul Ali Mazari, Afghan Hazara leader of Hizb-e-Wahdat
A local of Mazar-e-Sharif city in northern Afghanistan
Shireen Mazari, prominent Pakistani political analyst